A potato, Solanum tuberosum, is a tuberous food crop grown throughout the world.

Potato may also refer to:

Places
United States
 Potato Hill, a summit in Idaho
 Potato Lake, a lake in Minnesota
 Potato Patch, an unincorporated community in Arizona

Saint Helena, Ascension and Tristan da Cunha
 Potato Patches, an agricultural settlement in Tristan da Cunha

Art, entertainment, and media

Fictional entities
 Elena Potato, fictional Monster Allergy series character
 Potato, fictional Air novel character
 Potato, a main character from the kid's show, Chip and Potato

Films and television
 "Potato" (Blackadder), television episode from BBC sitcom Blackadder II
 Potato (film), a Korean film
Potato (production company), a British TV production company

Other art, entertainment, and media
 Potato (band), a Thai rock group
 Mr. Potato Head, a doll

Other uses
 Irish potato candy, a Philadelphia confectionery that resembles a potato
 Potato starch, starch refined from potato
 Sweet potato, another kind of vegetable
Slang for a sub-par computer

See also
 Potoooooooo (Pot-8-Os), an 18th-century racehorse